Bannu Division is one of seven divisions in Pakistan's Khyber Pakhtunkhwa province. It consists of three districts: Bannu, Lakki Marwat, and North Waziristan. According to the 2017 Pakistani Census, the division had a population of 2,656,801, making it the least populous division in the province, but it spans  of area, and this makes it the third-smallest division by area in the province. Lakki Marwat is the largest city of Bannu Division, with around 60,000 people, while the division's namesake and second-largest city is Bannu, with just under 50,000 people. The division borders Dera Ismail Khan Division to the south and west, Kohat Division to the north and east, and the province of Punjab, Pakistan to its east.

Districts

Districts are the administrative unit one level below divisions in the administrative hierarchy of Pakistan. Bannu Division consists of the following three districts:

History

In 1941, the area which today covers the division (excluding North Waziristan) was known as Bannu District. Bannu District was one of five trans-Indus districts in the North-West Frontier Province of British India, and it was split into the tehsils of Bannu and Marwat. Here is a description of the area given by the Imperial Gazetteer of India.

North Waziristan, on the other hand, was an agency in the province bordering Bannu District. It is also described in the Gazetteer.

After independence, Bannu District became a part of the then-much-larger Dera Ismail Khan Division.

The area received full-fledged division status between the Pakistani censuses of 1981 and 1998, and during the same time period, Lakki Marwat Tehsil (having been renamed from Marwat Tehsil) was also upgraded, to district status (becoming Lakki Marwat District).

In August 2000, Bannu Division was abolished along with every other division in the country, but was reinstated (with all the other divisions of Pakistan) eight years later after the elections of 2008.

In 2018, the 25th Amendment to the Constitution of Pakistan was passed by the Parliament of Pakistan and the Khyber Pakhtunkhwa Assembly. This entirely and fully merged the seven agencies of the Federally Administered Tribal Areas and the six Frontier Regions with the province of Khyber Pakhtunkhwa. With this merger, Bannu Division gained the agency of North Waziristan, which became a district, the Frontier Region Bannu (which was fully merged into Bannu District as Wazir Subdivision), and the Frontier Region Lakki Marwat (which was fully merged into Lakki Marwat District as Bettani Subdivision).

Geography 

The important Kurram River (a major tributary of the Indus River) flows through the division, flowing through North Waziristan District, Bannu District (where it flows near the namesake of the division, Bannu), and Lakki Marwat District (where it flows near the largest city in the division, Lakki Marwat), before it exits the division through the border with Punjab, where it will join the Indus.

Surrounding areas 

To Bannu Division's northwest, you will find Kohat Division, to the division's west and southwest, Dera Ismail Khan Division can be found. To the southeast of Bannu Division, Sargodha Division in the province of Punjab can be found, and Bannu Division borders the country of Afghanistan to its west.

Demographics 

As of the 2017 Census of Pakistan, the division had a population of 2,656,801, out of which there were 1,351,450 males, 1,305,326 females, and 25 people who identified as Transgender; this made the sex ratio of the division 1,035 males for every 1,000 females. The division had 284,583 households, making the average household size of the division 9.34.

Bannu Division had four urbanized areas in 2017, the lowest amount out of any division in the entire province, and its most populous city, Lakki Marwat, had a population of 59,465, and that made it the smallest city in the province that was classified as the largest city of its own division, and it only was the 20th largest city in the entire province. Bannu, the namesake of the division, in Bannu District, was the second-largest city in the division and the 25th largest in the province, with a population of 49,965. The city of Bannu, though, was the largest city in the division, in 1998, but its population stagnated throughout the period of time between 1998 and 2017, growing only 0.25% every year. The other two urbanized areas in the province are the town of Sarai Naurang of Lakki Marwat District, with a population of 29,955, and the only urbanized area in North Waziristan District (and the whole region of Waziristan), Miranshah, which had a population of 4,361 in 2017.

The division has one cantonment, the Bannu Cantonment, adjacent to the city of Bannu which had a population of 8,320, making up the division's entire military population. This made 0.31% of the entire population of the division active military personnel.

See also 

 Divisions of Pakistan
 Divisions of Khyber Pakhtunkhwa
 Dera Ismail Khan Division
 Hazara Division
 Kohat Division
 Malakand Division
 Mardan Division
 Peshawar Division
 Bannu District
 Bannu
 Ghoriwala
 Bazar Ahmad Khan
 Lakki Marwat District
 Lakki Marwat
 North Waziristan District
 Miranshah
 Waziristan
 Administrative units of Pakistan
 Districts of Khyber Pakhtunkhwa

Notes 

A.  Before 2018, the North Waziristan Agency (now North Waziristan District), the Frontier Region Bannu, and the Frontier Region Lakki Marwat were not a part of Bannu Division, but were a part of the Federally Administered Tribal Areas outside Khyber Pakhtunkhwa.

B.  There were only three constituencies solely inside Bannu Division at the time of the 2018 Pakistani general election, but there was a fourth constituency, NA-51, that was made of regions from different divisions. NA-51 covered the Frontier Region Bannu and the Frontier Region Lakki Marwat in Bannu Division, but together those areas only make up 19.42% of the population of the constituency and 2.61% of the population of the division, so it is omitted in the infobox. That seat was won by Muttahida Majlis-e-Amal.

C.  At the time of the 2018 Pakistani general election, Bannu District sent four representatives to the KPK Assembly and Lakki Marwat District sent three, but elections were held a year later (in 2019) in the areas of Khyber Pakhtunkhwa that were formerly part of the Federally Administered Tribal Areas. At the time of the 2019 elections, North Waziristan elected two representatives, which add up to nine for the entire division. Once again, though, there was another constituency, PK-115, that was made of regions from different divisions. PK-115 (just like NA-51) covered the Frontier Region Bannu and the Frontier Region Lakki Marwat in Bannu Division, but together those areas only make up 19.42% of the population of the constituency and 2.61% of the population of the division, so it is omitted in the infobox. That seat was won by Jamiat Ulema-e-Islam (F).

References 

Divisions of Khyber Pakhtunkhwa